Eugene You-hsin Chien (born  4 February 1946) is a Taiwanese politician and diplomat. He served as Foreign Minister of the Republic of China from 2002 to 2004.

Career
Eugene Chien, born in Taiwan in 1946, received his Bachelor of Science in mechanical engineering at National Taiwan University and Ph.D. in aeronautics and astronautics at New York University.

After receiving his Ph.D. at the age of 27, Chien taught in Tamkang University in Taiwan. In the following eleven years, he became a Professor and Chairman of the Department of Aeronautical Engineering and was subsequently promoted to be the Dean of College of Engineering in Tamkang University in 1978. Chien was presented with the “Outstanding Young Engineer of the Republic of China Award”, the “Ten Outstanding Young Persons of the Republic of China Award” in the 1970s and in 1985 he was recognized as the “Ten Outstanding Young Persons of the World ” by both Osaka Jaycees, Japan and Jaycees International.

In 1982, he hosted a national broadcasting TV program High Technology, in which he introduced various advanced technologies across the world to increase the public's interests in this subject. The program was well received amongst the public reaching over 30% of all viewers and subsequently obtained the Golden Bell Awards in Taiwan.

In 1983, Chien was elected as a legislator (Member of Parliament) in Taipei City with the highest number of votes. He was re-elected again in 1986. Throughout his political career, Chien served three different presidents from two different major political parties in Taiwan.

Chien was appointed as the first Minister of the Environmental Protection Administration (EPA) under Chiang Ching-kuo's presidency. In 1991, during Lee Teng-hui's presidency, he was appointed as the Minister of Transportation and Communications and Representative of Taipei Representative Office in the United Kingdom (Ambassador), and Senior Advisor of National Security Council.

In 1998 he was conferred an Honorary Fellowship by Cardiff University Wales, UK. In 2000, during President Chen Shui-bian's presidency, Chien was appointed as the Deputy Secretary General of the Office of the President and Minister of Foreign Affairs.

In 2007, Chien founded Taiwan Institute for Sustainable Energy (TAISE). He has led a variety of activities both at home and abroad in order to raise public awareness on climate change and sustainable energy. As part of his efforts, he has started to host a weekend national radio show on Broadcasting Corporation of China (BCC), called When the Earth Comes Down with a Fever, in which he frequently discusses issues relating to climate change. In 2010, Chien was presented the "Global Views Environmental Heroes Awards" by Yahoo and Global Views Monthly.

References

1946 births
Living people
Members of the 1st Legislative Yuan in Taiwan
National Taiwan University alumni
Taiwanese Ministers of Environment
Taiwanese Ministers of Foreign Affairs
Taiwanese Ministers of Transportation and Communications
Kuomintang Members of the Legislative Yuan in Taiwan
Politicians of the Republic of China on Taiwan from Taoyuan City
Taipei Members of the Legislative Yuan
Academic staff of Tamkang University
Category21st-century Taiwanese politicians